Himantoglossum caprinum is a species of orchid native to southeastern Europe and the Middle East.

Two subspecies are recognized:

Himantoglossum caprinum subsp. caprinum - Crete and other Greek Islands, Crimea, Iran, Iraq, Turkey, Palestine, Israel, Bulgaria
Himantoglossum caprinum subsp. rumelicum H.Baumann & R.Lorenz - Czech Republic, Croatia, Montenegro, Greece, Crimea, North Caucasus, Turkey, Palestine, Israel

References

External links 

caprinum
Orchids of Europe
Flora of Lebanon
Flora of Turkey
Flora of Palestine (region)
Flora of Iran
Flora of Iraq